John Gary Driscoll  (18 April 1946 – 8 June 1987) was an American R&B-style rock drummer who performed in a number of successful bands from the 1960s until his unsolved death by murder on June 10, 1987.

He first entered the music scene when he joined Ronnie Dio and The Prophets in June 1965, fronted by Ronnie James Dio. The band transformed into The Electric Elves, The Elves, and finally Elf in 1969, releasing a few singles along the way.  They were eventually discovered by Deep Purple bassist Roger Glover who went on to produce two of Elf's three studio albums.

Elf disbanded in 1975 when Gary Driscoll, Ronnie James Dio, Micky Lee Soule (Elf's keyboardist), and Craig Gruber (their bassist) were recruited by Deep Purple guitarist Ritchie Blackmore to form the rock band Rainbow.

Driscoll was dismissed from Rainbow shortly after their debut album, entitled Ritchie Blackmore's Rainbow, was recorded. It is speculated that firing Gary was simply due to his R&B style of drumming, which did not sit well with Blackmore.    Driscoll was later replaced with British hard rocker, Cozy Powell.

After his departure from Rainbow, Driscoll played in the band Dakota (1978–1980, from Scranton, Pa. formally the Jerry Kelly Band), before starting Bible Black  with Craig Gruber, future Blue Cheer guitarist Duck MacDonald and singer Jeff Fenholt. This band released the albums Ground Zero and, with a few other musicians, Thrasher, neither of which sold well. Driscoll found a day job, and made a little extra money on the side as a session musician.

Driscoll was found murdered in Ithaca, New York on June 8, 1987. Details of his murder remain blurred and his murder unsolved. There is evidence to suggest that the murder was carried out by more than one person; one man who was accused was later acquitted while the chief suspect fled the USA before being charged.

See also
List of unsolved murders

References

1946 births
1987 deaths
1987 murders in the United States
20th-century American male musicians
20th-century American drummers
American heavy metal drummers
American male drummers
American murder victims
Musicians from Ithaca, New York
Rainbow (rock band) members
Elf (band) members
Murder in New York (state)
Unsolved murders in the United States